is a Japanese triathlete, who has taken part in numerous triathlon championships. At the peak of his career, he has won eight championship titles, including four from the ITC Triathlon Asian Cup. His best international result happened in 2010, when he finished third at the ITC World Cup in Ishigaki, Japan.

Yamamoto was selected to the Japanese national triathlon team, along with his teammate Hirokatsu Tayama, at the 2008 Summer Olympics in Beijing. He finished only in thirtieth place in men's triathlon, with a time of 1:52:11. Despite of his disappointing finish at the Olympics, Yamamoto was able to complete a two-spot medal sweep for Japan at the 2010 Asian Games in Guangzhou, China, when he claimed silver in the men's triathlon, just behind his compatriot Yuichi Hosoda by twenty-six hundredths of a second.

References

External links
ITU Profile

1979 births
Living people
Japanese male triathletes
Triathletes at the 2008 Summer Olympics
Olympic triathletes of Japan
Sportspeople from Kyoto
Triathletes at the 2010 Asian Games
Triathletes at the 2006 Asian Games
Asian Games medalists in triathlon
Asian Games silver medalists for Japan
Medalists at the 2010 Asian Games
21st-century Japanese people